Greytown, population 2,202 (at the 2013 Census), is a rural town in the centre of the Wairarapa region of New Zealand, in the lower North Island. It is 80 km north-east of Wellington and 25 kilometres southwest of Masterton, on State Highway 2. It was awarded the title of New Zealand's Most Beautiful Small Town 2017 (pop less than 5,000).

History and culture

European settlement

Greytown was first settled on 27 March 1854 under the Small Farms Association Settlement Scheme and was named after Governor Sir George Grey, who arranged for the land to be bought from local Māori. It became a Borough in 1878 and a ward of the South Wairarapa District Council in 1989.

The first Arbor Day celebration in New Zealand was held in Greytown on 3 July 1890. Greytown Beautification Society has done a lot to keep the spirit alive for many years, especially Stella Bull Park and the park bench in the park dedicated to her, which states, "Only God can make a Tree". The town has many beautiful trees and a register is kept to help protect them. The Tree Advisory Group to the Greytown Community Board actively works to preserve trees and the historic tree register is in the process of being updated in collaboration with the Greytown Community Board and South Wairarapa District Council.

Marae and Māori Parliament

Pāpāwai Marae is located east of Greytown. It is affiliated with the Ngāti Kahungunu hapū of Ngāti Kahukuranui o Kahungunu Kauiti, Ngāti Meroiti and Ngāti Moe, and the Rangitāne hapū of Ngāti Meroiti, Ngāti Moe, Ngāti Tauiao and Ngāti Tūkoko.

The marae's meeting house, named Hikurangi, dates from 1888 and is unique in that the magnificent carved ancestors that surround the pā face inward. In the late 19th century the wharenui was an important site of Te Kotahitanga, the Māori parliament movement. In the 1890s sessions were held at Pāpāwai, and were reported in Huia Tangata Kotahi, a Māori-language newspaper published by Īhāia Hūtana from 1893 to 1895. A large building was constructed at Pāpāwai to house the parliament, used for sessions in 1897 and 1898. The parliament passed a resolution to end the sale of Māori land and was visited by Governor General Lord Ranfurly, and by Premier Richard Seddon. From the 1910s Pāpāwai fell into disrepair, and little was done until the 1960s when conservation work was carried out on the carved figures. In the late 1980s the marae was fully restored, and is again in full use by the community.

The Māori name for Greytown is Te Hūpēnui, the literal translation of which is "the big snot", better translated as "the fluid that comes out of your nose at a tangi or funeral".

In October 2020, the Government committed $2,179,654 from the Provincial Growth Fund to upgrade Ngāi Tumapuhia a Rangi ki Okautete, Motuwairaka, Pāpāwai, Kohunui, Hurunui o Rangi and Te Oreore marae. The projects were expected to create 19.8 full time jobs.

Demographics 

Greytown had a population of 2,466 at the 2018 New Zealand census, an increase of 228 people (10.2%) since the 2013 census, and an increase of 363 people (17.3%) since the 2006 census. There were 1,044 households. There were 1,176 males and 1,287 females, giving a sex ratio of 0.91 males per female. The median age was 51.5 years (compared with 37.4 years nationally), with 429 people (17.4%) aged under 15 years, 243 (9.9%) aged 15 to 29, 1,077 (43.7%) aged 30 to 64, and 726 (29.4%) aged 65 or older.

Ethnicities were 93.6% European/Pākehā, 9.1% Māori, 1.9% Pacific peoples, 2.3% Asian, and 1.5% other ethnicities (totals add to more than 100% since people could identify with multiple ethnicities).

The proportion of people born overseas was 18.2%, compared with 27.1% nationally.

Although some people objected to giving their religion, 51.5% had no religion, 38.1% were Christian, 0.2% were Hindu, 0.4% were Buddhist and 2.2% had other religions.

Of those at least 15 years old, 543 (26.7%) people had a bachelor or higher degree, and 327 (16.1%) people had no formal qualifications. The median income was $32,200, compared with $31,800 nationally. The employment status of those at least 15 was that 921 (45.2%) people were employed full-time, 330 (16.2%) were part-time, and 42 (2.1%) were unemployed.

Economy

Tourism 
Greytown is a popular weekend and holiday destination. The main street has a number of boutique, antique stores and cafés. The official camping ground next to the soldiers' memorial park is very popular during long weekends and holidays. Swimming is free at the Greytown Memorial Park which remains a monument to the men of Greytown who gave their lives in both World Wars. Within the park are 117 lime trees, planted in 1922 to commemorate the 117 soldiers from the community who died in WW1. With cycling becoming increasingly popular the Woodside Rail Trail is a regular spot for visitors. The 5 km rail trail winds through quiet farmland, native plantings and heritage trees to Woodside Station, with great views of the Tararua Ranges.

Image and architecture

The town is proud of its history, claiming to have the most complete main street of Victorian architecture in the country, and of being the first planned inland town. It has played on these assets, creating a revival largely based on its architecture. Retailers like the butcher have changed their 1970s street frontage to a more Victorian one. The town recognises that buildings need to be maintained in order to maintain the town's charm and in 2016–2017 six significant building were restored/painted. This formed part of Greytown's submission for the most beautiful small town in New Zealand.

Cobblestones Museum, a regional history museum, on 167 Main Street, contains six Historic Places Trust category 2 buildings. In 2014 it opened a new exhibition building which showcases Greytown and Wairarapa history. It has embarked on an ambitious plan to restore all the listed buildings under conservation plans and now ranks as the top thing to see in Greytown on Trip Advisor.

Heritage buildings are recorded by the Greytown Heritage Trust. The Greytown Heritage Trust was formed with the primary object of encouraging and facilitating the preservation of historic buildings in and around Greytown, with particular attention being given to the Greytown Historic Heritage Precinct as defined in the Wairarapa Combined District Plan. The Greytown Hotel claims to be one of New Zealand's oldest surviving hotels.

Greytown was marketed as "The fruit bowl of the Wairarapa" when fruit was grown on the west of the town with orchards like Westhaven and Pinehaven.

The Kidds came to Greytown in 1906 from Wanganui where they had been engaged in fruit growing. In 1910 they bought a twenty-acre farm let in Udy Street which he planted with a mixture of soft fruits (blackcurrants & gooseberries) and apple trees. They made the improvement to the orchard, their main purpose in life, continually experimenting with propagating new varieties of apples. Their experiments with cross pollination resulted in the fixing of several commercial varieties, the most notable of which are the Kidd’s Orange Red, Freyburg and Gala which is grown worldwide.

Transport 
The town is linked to Wellington and Masterton by train and New Zealand State Highway 2, the latter via a scenic mountain route peaking at the Remutaka summit.

In the 1870s, when the Public Works Department announced plans that the Wairarapa Line railway between Featherston and Masterton was not going to pass through Greytown, local protests were successful in attaining approval for a branch line from the Wairarapa Line at Woodside, which opened on 14 May 1880.  For a few months Greytown was the terminus of the Wairarapa Line before the extension from Woodside to Masterton opened, but once it was relegated to branch line status it was one of the quietest railway lines in the country.  It closed on 24 December 1953, and at the time of closure its revenue was only a tenth of its operating costs. Greytown passengers are now serviced by Woodside Railway Station on the Wairarapa Line.

Education 
Greytown has two schools:
 Greytown School is a state full primary (Year 1–8) school with  students as of  It was established in 1857.
 Kuranui College is a state secondary (Year 9–13) school with  students as of  It was established in 1960, replacing the district high schools in Carterton, Greytown, Featherston and Martinborough.

Sport

Greytown Rugby club, established in 1877, is one of the oldest in the country.

Cricket has a long history in Greytown. On New Year's Day 1867, festivities at Greytown included men's and women's cricket matches – the first known instance of women's cricket in New Zealand. Greytown Cricket Club, established later in 1867, is the second-oldest cricket club in New Zealand, and 10 years older than Test cricket. It has been the powerhouse of the Wairarapa competition, with all three Senior teams winning their competitions in the 2005–06 season, and almost repeating the feat (two out of three) in 2006–07. 

There are over 30 sports clubs in Greytown which come under the umbrella of Greytown Community Sport and Leisure Society, a volunteer organization.

The Wellington Gliding Club  operates from the Greytown Soaring Centre in Papawai, approximately 4 km east of Greytown on Tilsons Road.

Notes

External links

A site about Greytown's historic and notable trees 

 
Populated places in the Wellington Region